Namira (means Immortal) is a novel in Persian language by Sadegh Karamyar. Its story is based on the Battle of Karbala. The book has been published by Neyestan Publications in Iran.

Author

Sadegh Karamyar is an Iranian writer and film director. He was born in 1959 in Tehran, Iran. Karamyar was in charge of the special magazine called "Information of the Front" in the Iran–Iraq War zones from 1986 to 1988, and from 1993 to 1996 he was in charge of the literary page "Sprouts of Thought" of the Ettela'at newspaper and also the deputy editor of the film magazine called "People and Cinema" affiliated to the Farabi Cinema Foundation. Karamyar is known in Iran for writing novels such as "Namira" and "Burning Plains" as well as directing series such as "The Day Before" and "The Memoirs of an Unfinished Man". He has a first-class artistic certificate from the Ministry of Culture and Islamic Guidance of Iran, has written several novels, screenplays and has directed several films and TV series. One of the Karmiyar's other activities in the cultural field is the literary and artistic management of Tehran Municipality Cultural and Artistic Organization for more than five years.

Theme

The main core of the Namira story, is the process of joining a man from the tribe of Bani Kalb named Abdullah ibn Umayr Abu Wahab to the army of Husayn ibn Ali in Battle of Karbala. The book is a simple narrative that starts from the situation of city Kufa and reaches the Battle of Karbala.

The Namira story expression is fluent and in modern language so as to create intimacy that attracts the audience. The author has used the singular third person or the omniscient personality to tell the story.

Awards
The book Namira has been recognized as a book worthy of appreciation in the third period of Jalal Al-e Ahmad Literary Awards, which is considered the most expensive literary award in Iran, in 2009. The book was also introduced as the selected work of the fourth festival of "Top Religion and Research Books" (an Iranian book festival).

According to Mehr News Agency, the fourth period of Rushana study campaign started with the novel Namira written by Sadegh Karamyar.

The book Namira, also selected as Worthy of appreciation in the 28th Iran's Book of the Year Awards in 2009.

Excerpts from this book were published in the form of an animation called Namira.

The book Namira has been reprinted 33 times so far.

See also
 Battle of Karbala
 Maqtal al-Husayn
 Abu Mikhnaf
 Reflection on the Ashura movement
 The intellectual and political life of Shia Imams

References

External links
 Part of the Namira book chosen by the author (in Persian language)
 Clip: a description on Namira
 Clip: Interview with Sadegh Karamyar and introduction of the book "Namira" on IRIB TV3

Battle of Karbala
Iranian novels
Books about Husayn ibn Ali
Iranian books
Third-person narrative novels